Alton Jackson was an American football coach. He was the sixth head football coach at Tennessee A&I State College—now known as Tennessee State University—in Nashville, Tennessee and he held that position for the 1929 season, compiling a record of 3–2–1.

References

Year of birth missing
Year of death missing
Tennessee State Tigers football coaches